Gay is a surname. Notable people with the surname include:

Adelaide Gay (born 1989), American soccer goalkeeper
Al Gay (1928–2013), British jazz tenor saxophonist
Alberta Gay (1913–1987), American domestic worker, mother of Marvin Gaye
Amandine Gay (born 1984), French-African feminist, film maker, and actress 
Andrew Gay (born 1989), Australian rugby league footballer
Antoine Gay (1790–1871), Frenchman believed to have been possessed by a demon named Isacaron
Arnold Gay (born 1967), Singaporean TV and radio presenter 
Benjamin Gay (born 1980), former American football running back
Bill Gay (1927–2008), professional American football player
Blenda Gay (1950–1976), defensive end in the National Football League
Bram Gay (1930–2019), trumpet player and brass band enthusiast
Brian Gay (born 1971), American golfer
Byron Gay (1886–1945), American songwriter
Cesc Gay (born 1967), movie director
Charles R. Gay (1875–1946), American banker and president of the New York Stock Exchange
Charlotte Evelyn Gay (1867-1958), English social and temperance reformer
Chet Gay (1900–1978), American football player
Christopher Daniel Gay (born 1974), American habitual car thief
Claude Gay (1800–1873), French botanist
Claudine Gay, American academic
Connie B. Gay (1914–1989), American country music promoter
D. J. Gay (born 1989), retired American professional basketball player
Dale Pickett Gay (1891–1988), Wyoming clubwoman in the oil business
Danny Gay (disambiguation), various people
David Gay (1920–2010), British Army officer, recipient of the Military Cross, and English cricketer
Désirée Gay (1810–1891), French socialist feminist
Duncan Gay (born 1950), an Australian politician
Earl C. Gay (1902–1972) was a registered pharmacist, member of the Los Angeles City Council
Edward Gay (disambiguation), several people
Edwin Francis Gay (1867–1946), American economist 
E. Jane Gay (1830–1919), American woman who devoted her life to social reform and photography
Éric Gay (born 1958), French politician in New Caledonia
Everett Gay (born 1964), former American football wide receiver
Federico Gay (disambiguation), various people
Francisque Gay (1885–1963), French editor, politician and diplomat
Françoise Gay (born 1945), Swiss alpine skier
Frank William Gay (1920–2007), American executive who oversaw several entities for Howard Hughes
Frederick Parker Gay (1874–1939), American bacteriologist who combated typhoid fever and leprosy
Geneva Gay, American academic and author
Geoff Gay (born 1957), English former professional footballer
George Gay (disambiguation), various people
Georges Gay (1926–1997), French professional racing cyclist
Gerald Gay (born 1956), American politician
Git Gay (1921–2007), Swedish revue director, actress, and singer
Greg Gay (born 1952), American politician
Heather Gay (born 1974), American television personality
Henry M. Gay, one of three founders of Triad Systems Corporation, now known as Activant
Hobart R. Gay (1894–1983), American general
Jacques Etienne Gay (1786–1864) French botanist
Jacques Gay (born 1851), French painter
Jamal Gay (born 1989), soccer player from Trinidad and Tobago
Jason Gay (born 1972), birth name of Christian singer-songwriter Jason Gray; made many recordings as Jason Gay before changing his name to Gray
Jean Baptiste Gay, vicomte de Martignac (1778–1832), French statesman
Jennifer Gay (born 1935), on-screen BBC Children's TV continuity announcer
Jesús Bal y Gay (1905–1993), Spanish composer, music critic, and musicologist
Joey Gay (born 1971), American actor and comedian
John Gay (1685–1732), English dramatist
John Gay (disambiguation), various people
Jonathan Gay (born 1967), inventor of Macromedia Flash
Jordan Gay (born 1990), American football kickoff specialist
José Aurelio Gay (born 1965), Spanish football player and manager
José María Pérez Gay (1944–2013), Mexican academic, writer, translator and diplomat
Joseph Louis Gay-Lussac (1778–1850), French physicist
Jotham Gay (1733–1802), army officer, political figure in Nova Scotia
Mabel Gay (born 1983), Cuban triple jumper
Madam Gay (1978–1983), British Thoroughbred racehorse
Maddison Gay (born 1996), Australian rules footballer
Maria Gay (1879–1943), Catalan opera singer
Marie-Louise Gay (born 1952), Canadian children's writer and illustrator
Martin Gay (1726–1809), metal smith and political figure in Nova Scotia
Marvin Gay, Sr. (1914–1998), American minister of the House of God
Mary Ann Harris Gay (1829–1918), American writer of Life in Dixie During the War
Matt Gay (born 1994), American football player
Michel Gay (born 1947), French illustrator and author of children's books
Nikolai Ge or Gay (1831–1894), Russian painter
Noel Gay (1898–1954), English composer of popular music
Pamela L. Gay (born 1973), American astronomer, educator, podcaster, writer
Patrice Gay (born 1973), French former racing driver
Patrick Gay (1815–1866), emigrated to South Australia aboard James Fernie in 1854
Paul Gay (born 1968), French opera singer
Peter Gay (1923–2015), German-born U.S. historian
Ramón Gay (1917–1960), Mexican film actor
Randall Gay (born 1982), American football player
Richard Gay (disambiguation), various people
Robert Gay (disambiguation), various people
Ross Gay (born 1974), American poet and professor
Roxane Gay (born 1974), American writer, professor, editor, and commentator
Rudy Gay (born 1986), American professional basketball player
Ruth Gay (1922–2006), Jewish writer
Samuel Gay (1754–1847), judge and political figure in New Brunswick
Sophie Gay (1776–1852), French author who was born in Paris
Steve Gay (born 1947), former U.S. collegiate soccer player
Susan Elizabeth Gay (1845–1918), chronicler of the history of Old Falmouth
Sydney Howard Gay (1814–1888), American attorney, journalist and abolitionist
Terry Gay (born 1947), former Australian rules footballer
Thomas Gay (1884–1953), intelligence officer
Thomas Gay (MP) (1378–1390), English politician
Tim Gay (born 1964), politician in the U.S. state of Nebraska
Titus Gay (1787–1837), born into slavery and freed in 1812
Tyson Gay (born 1982), American sprinter
Virginia Gay (born 1981), Australian actress
Walter Gay (1856–1937), American artist
William Gay (disambiguation), various people
Winckworth Allan Gay (1821–1910), American landscape artist

See also
Enola Gay, name of airplane that dropped nuclear bombs on Japan in 1945, named for Paul Tibbets' mother
Gaye (disambiguation)

English-language surnames
French-language surnames
Spanish-language surnames